Ali Baba is a term describing business practices in Malaysia and Indonesia involving indigenous and non-indigenous cooperation to take advantage of affirmative action provisions favouring indigenous Malays or Native Indonesians. In this arrangement, a Malay or Indonesian becomes the front person for a firm which is financed and run by a Chinese person (who may be a local citizen).

Malaysia
Ali Baba is a business practice in Malaysia, where a Malay company obtains a contract from the government-sponsored affirmative action system for the Bumiputera (the Malaysian New Economic Policy under Ketuanan Melayu) and subcontracts it to an ethnically Chinese-owned company. The “Ali”, which is a typical Muslim name, refers to the Malay; the “Baba” the Chinese, from the Baba-Nyonya (Straits Chinese) people.

Indonesia
The term Ali Baba came into usage when Iskaq Tjokrohadisurjo was Minister of Economics in the First Ali Sastroamidjojo Cabinet (30 July 1953 – 11 August 1955).

Purpose
This program was enacted to advance pribumi – who were also called Bumiputera before Soeharto's New Order which means ethnically native businessman (but now also includes women) – to engage pribumi businessmen in order to advance national economics, to transition the economic system from a colonial system to a national system, and to encourage cooperation between pribumi and non-pribumi businessmen. Ali (a typical Muslim name) represents pribumi, while Baba (sometimes a collective name for peranakan Chinese), represents non-pribumi and is associated with Chinese Indonesians.

Practice
When this program was in effect, pribumi businessman was ordered to give training and responsibility to Indonesian workforce in order to hold staff position as government gave loan and licence to national private business. Government also gave protection in order to compete with foreign businesses. However, this program was ended in failure because less experience of 'pribumi' businessman, liberal system was in effect and less compete ability of 'pribumi' businessman.

However, the core of this program, which in favor of native people, is resurfaced as new concept of putra daerah (which may be literally translated as "son of the land"), as autonomy system instated. In this concept, many official position, contract and education seat will be awarded to native. However, this concept is not acknowledged officially.

References

Economy of Malaysia
Economy of Indonesia